Kiruna Municipality is a municipality in Norrbotten County in northernmost Sweden. Its seat is located in Kiruna.

Finnish, Meänkieli and Sami have the official status of being minority languages in the municipality.

History
During the 20th century the mining settlement Kiruna was built in the parish of Jukkasjärvi, at that time a rural municipality in very remote territory. A so-called municipalsamhälle (which was a kind of borough established within a rural municipality to take care of some matters of urban character) was instituted in 1908. The settlement grew (it even had a tramway system) and it was decided to make it a city. On 1 January 1948 the whole parish of Jukkasjärvi was transformed into the City of Kiruna. As the vast wilderness around the town itself was included, Kiruna was at that time regarded as the largest city municipality in the world. Only a few more cities were instituted in Sweden, the last one in 1951. Instead the differences between the three types of municipalities were diminished and finally abolished altogether. In 1971 Kiruna, as all others, became a unitary municipality and at the same time merged with Karesuando.

Geography
Kebnekaise is Sweden's and Sápmi's highest mountain at 2,104 metres above mean sea level. There are more than 6,000 lakes in Kiruna municipality, Lake Torneträsk being the largest. Seven rivers run through the municipality, named Kalix River, Torne River, Lainio River, Rautas River and Vittangi River, as well as Könkämä River and Muonio River which mark the border to Finland. The untouched geography has also been noted with the establishment of Abisko National Park, by the Norwegian border, established as early as 1909.

Localities
There are seven localities (or urban areas) in Kiruna Municipality:

The municipal seat in bold

Elections

Riksdag
These are the results of the elections to the Riksdag for Kiruna Municipality since the 1972 municipal reform. Norrbotten Party also contested the 1994 election but due to the party's small size at a nationwide level SCB did not publish the party's results at a municipal level. The same applies to the Sweden Democrats between 1988 and 1998. "Turnout" denotes the percentage of eligible voters casting any ballots, whereas "Votes" denotes the number of actual valid ballots cast.

Blocs

This lists the relative strength of the socialist and centre-right blocs since 1973, but parties not elected to the Riksdag are inserted as "other", including the Sweden Democrats results from 1988 to 2006, but also the Christian Democrats pre-1991 and the Greens in 1982, 1985 and 1991. The sources are identical to the table above. The coalition or government mandate marked in bold formed the government after the election. New Democracy got elected in 1991 but are still listed as "other" due to the short lifespan of the party.

Sister city
Kiruna Municipality has one sister city:
 Arkhangelsk, Russia

Notable native
Börje Salming, Swedish ice hockey player

References

External links

Kiruna Municipality – Official site

 
Municipalities of Norrbotten County
Sámi-language municipalities
Meänkieli language municipalities
Kiruna